Bardot is the debut album by Australian female pop group of the same name, released in May 2000 (see 2000 in music). They had been formed during a TV talent quest, Popstars.

The album reached number one on the ARIA Albums Chart and the Official New Zealand Music Chart. It provided the singles "Poison" (April 2000), "I Should've Never Let You Go" (May) and "These Days" (August).

History

Bardot was recorded in early 2000 while the Popstars program was airing on Network Seven, and the show included footage of the girls in the recording studio, laying down vocals for songs. Original member Chantelle Barry recorded vocals for the album, but following her sudden departure from the group, new member Tiffani Wood re-recorded Barry's parts.

The album has 12 songs, which Wood later described in an interview as "bubblegum pop", and mixes together a number of music genres including Motown ("Down"), gospel ("Higher Than Heaven"), country ("What Have You Done") and Latin pop ("Got Me Where You Want Me"). The two ballads, "Missin' Your Love" and "Love Me No More", were written by the Dowlut brothers who were known as R&B duo Kaylan when they toured in support of Bardot. In 2002, the brothers formed the dance act Disco Montego, and recorded with Katie Underwood after she left Bardot.

Following Underwood's departure in mid-2001, the album was released in the UK. A slightly different track listing was used, opening with a new song, "ASAP" (which was the first single from the Bardot's second studio album Play It Like That), and new artwork with more recent photos of the band. Despite Underwood's vocals featuring on 12 of the 13 songs, her name or picture does not feature at all in the packaging.

The album debuted at number one on the Australian ARIA Charts, making Bardot the first Australian act to have their debut single and debut album enter the charts at number one. The album was certified double platinum (140,000+) and became the twentieth biggest selling album in Australia of 2000. The album also sold well internationally, reaching number one in New Zealand, with a platinum certification, and peaked at #2 in Singapore where it was twelfth highest selling album of 2000. It was nominated in the Highest Selling Album category at the 2000 ARIA Music Awards but lost to Savage Garden's Affirmation.

Track listing

Standard edition
"These Days" (Colin Campsie/Phil Thornalley)
"I Should've Never Let You Go" (Tommy Faragher/Lotti Golden/Hinda Hicks)
"Higher Than Heaven" (Alan Glass/Laura Pallas/Jodie Wilson)
"Poison" (Darryl Sims/Michael Szumowski)
"Missin' Your Love" (Darren Dowlut/Dennis Dowlut)
"Down" (Nick Howard)
"Other Side of Love" (Eliot Kennedy)
"What Have You Done" (Eliot Kennedy)
"Love Me No More" (Darren Dowlut/Dennis Dowlut)
"Girls Do, Boys Don't" (Dow Brain/Kara DioGuardi/Brad Young)
"Holding On" (Ashley Cadell)
"Got Me Where You Want Me" (Lindy Robbins/Kevin Savigar)

Singapore limited edition bonus AVCD
"Poison" (music video)
"I Should've Never Let You Go" (music video)
"These Days" (music video)
"Empty Room"
"Do It for Love"

UK edition
"ASAP"  
"These Days"
"Higher Than Heaven"
"Poison"
"Missin' Your Love"
"Down"
"What Have You Done"
"Love Me No More"
"Girls Do, Boys Don't"
"Holding On"
"Got Me Where You Want Me"
"Empty Room"
"I Should've Never Let You Go" (Allstars Remix)

Charts

Weekly charts

Year-end charts

Certifications

See also
List of number-one albums of 2000 (Australia)
List of number-one albums from the 2000s (New Zealand)

References

2000 debut albums
Bardot (Australian band) albums